Al Wajh, also written Al Wejh, is a coastal city in north-western Saudi Arabia, situated on the coast of the Red Sea. The city is located in the Tabuk Province. It is one of the largest cities in Tabuk region, with a population of 50,000 as of 2013.

Al Wajh played a pivotal role during the Arab Revolt in World War I. In 1917, Al Wajh was taken by Prince Faisal's forces and used as a base of operations for a series of attacks on the Hejaz Railway. (See  HMS Anne for the British side of that operation). 

Al Wajh is a comparatively big city, inhabited mainly by citizens from Al Balawi, Bedaiwi-Alali, Al Huety and Al Johani  tribes. Fishing is a primary activity of the city's residents and the port is the central location where this occurs - the Al Wajh port used to be one of the main shipping centres in the region 50 years ago.

The town is served by the Al Wajh Domestic Airport and has close links with the city of Tabuk, with a road connecting the two locations.

In Art and Literature 
Al Wajh is the subject of a painting by Clarkson Frederick Stanfield, an engraving of which was published in Fisher's Drawing Room Scrap Book, 1832 as  along with a poetical illustration by Letitia Elizabeth Landon that reflects on the slowness of navigation amongst the numerous coral reefs in the area.

References

Wajh
Wajh